General elections were held in Malta on 26 October 1996. Although the Malta Labour Party received the most votes, the Nationalist Party won the most seats. However, the Labour Party was awarded an additional four seats to ensure they had a majority in Parliament.

Results
Malta Labour Party took 31 seats in the election. As per constitution, having more votes than the Nationalist Party, it was given four top-up seats.

By district

1st District

AD: 216 votes
MLP: 9,870 votes
PN: 10,101 votes
Others: 18 votes
Candidates Elected: Alfred Sant (MLP), Sandro Schembri Adami (MLP), Guido de Marco (PN), Antoine Mifsud Bonnici (PN), Austin Gatt (PN).

2nd District

AD: 231 votes
MLP: 13,645 votes
PN: 6,006 votes
Candidates Elected: Dom Mintoff (MLP), Joe Mizzi (MLP), Edwin Grech (MLP), Chris Agius (MLP), Lawrence Gonzi (PN)

3rd District

AD: 289 votes
MLP: 12,941 votes
PN: 6,731 votes
Others: 12 votes
Candidates Elected: George Vella (MLP), Alfred Portelli (MLP), Helena Dalli (MLP), Francis Agius (PN), Joe Psaila Savona (PN).

4th District

AD: 313 votes
MLP: 12,750 votes
PN: 7,668 votes
Candidates Elected: Joe Cilia (MLP), Joe Cassar (PN), Jesmond Mugliett (PN), Alex Sceberras Trigona (MLP), Karl Chircop (MLP).

5th District

AD: 258 votes
MLP: 12,932 votes
PN: 6,726 votes
Candidates Elected: George Vella (MLP), Karmenu Vella (MLP), Louis Buhagiar (MLP), Ninu Zammit (PN), Louis Galea (PN).

6th District

AD: 170 votes
MLP: 11,119 votes
PN: 8,472 votes
Candidates Elected: Charles Mangion (MLP), Lino Spiteri (MLP), John Attard Montalto (MLP), John Dalli (PN), George Hyzler (PN).

7th District

AD: 368 votes
MLP: 9,715 votes
PN: 11,025 votes
Candidates Elected: Louis Galea (PN), Charles Buhagiar (MLP), Micheal Bonnici (PN), Jeffry Pullicino Orlando (PN), John Attard Montalto (MLP).

8th District

AD: 336 votes
MLP: 7,663 votes
PN: 11,468 votes
Candidates Elected: Eddie Fenech Adami (PN), Alfred Sant (MLP), Joe Debono Grech (MLP), Tonio Borg (PN), Josef Bonnici (PN).

9th District

AD: 336 votes
MLP: 8,863 votes
PN: 10,253 votes
Candidates Elected: Adrian Vassallo (MLP), Leo Brincat (MLP), Francis Zammit Dimech (PN), Joe Borg (PN), John Vella(PN)

10th District

AD: 461 votes
MLP: 5,834 votes
PN: 13,870 votes
Candidates Elected: Evarist Bartolo (MLP), Guido de Marco (PN), Michael Refalo (PN), Francis Zammit Dimech (PN), Michael Frendo (PN).

11th District

AD: 359 votes
MLP: 8,700 votes
PN: 11,459
Candidates Elected: Eddie Fenech Adami (PN), Louis Deguara (PN), Josef Bonnici (PN), Michael Farrugia (MLP), Angelo Farrugia (MLP)

12th District

AD: 276 votes
MLP: 9,400 votes
PN: 10,382 votes
Others: 13 votes
Candidates Elected: Noel Farrugia (MLP), Ċensu Galea (PN), Evarist Bartolo (MLP), Claude Muscat (PN), Tony Abela (PN)

13th District

AD: 168 votes
MLP: 9,066 votes
PN: 10,700 votes
Candidates Elected: Giovanna Debono (PN), Anton Refalo (MLP), Anton Tabone (PN), Karmenu Borg (MLP), Victor Galea Pace (PN)

References

General elections in Malta
Malta
General
Malta